American singer Katy Perry has recorded songs for six studio albums. After singing at church during her childhood, she decided to pursue a career in music in her teenage years. She signed a record deal with Red Hill Records, and released a gospel album called Katy Hudson in 2001. She wrote its songs "Last Call", "My Own Monster", "Spit", and "When There's Nothing Left" by herself while co-writing the remaining six with Mark Dickson, Scott Faircloff, Tommy Collier, and Brian White. The album was unsuccessful and it failed to garner any attention. Red Hill Records shut down later that year. Following two unsuccessful contracts with Island Def Jam Records and Columbia Records, whereby Perry was dropped by both them before she could finish an album, she ultimately secured a deal with Capitol Records in 2007, a division of record label Virgin.

Her second studio album, One of the Boys, was released in June 2008. The pop-rock album was composed over a period of five years. The lead single, "I Kissed a Girl", was co-written by Perry with Dr. Luke, Max Martin and Cathy Dennis, and alludes to bisexuality. Perry was the sole writer of  "Thinking of You", "Mannequin", and the album's title track. The songs "Mannequin" and "Lost" have themes of determination and self-belief. The track "Ur So Gay" opens with the lyrics "I hope you hang yourself with your H&M scarf," which BBC critic Lizzie Ennever believed was Perry's response to people who may have "wronged her in the past". During the recording process of the album, Perry had written the songs "I Do Not Hook Up" and "Long Shot" with Kara DioGuardi and Greg Wells, but decided not to include them on the final track list. They were later recorded by American singer Kelly Clarkson for her album All I Ever Wanted (2009). In 2009, she released a live album titled MTV Unplugged, which featured acoustic performances of five tracks from One of the Boys along with two new recordings, "Brick by Brick" and "Hackensack".

Perry released her third studio album, Teenage Dream, in August 2010. She reunited with Dr. Luke, Max Martin and Greg Wells for most of the songs, but also worked with some new writers and producers for the project. For the track "Firework", Perry collaborated with Sandy Vee, Ester Dean and the Norwegian production duo Stargate, and with Tricky Stewart on the songs "Who Am I Living For?" and "Circle the Drain". Lyrically, "Who Am I Living For?" recalls Perry's Christian roots and retells the biblical story of Esther, the Jewish Queen of Persia who discovered and foiled Haman's plan to massacre the Jewish community. "Circle the Drain" alludes to a previous boyfriend's drug addiction, speculated to be about Travie McCoy, and the effects it had on them as a couple, with lyrics which include "You fall asleep during foreplay/ 'Cause the pills you take are more your forte." Another Stargate produced track called "Peacock" makes use of double entendres whereby Perry propositions her lover with showing her his penis, singing "I wanna see your peacock, cock, cock."

The singer re-released the album in March 2012 with the title Teenage Dream: The Complete Confection. New material included alternate versions of some of the standard songs, including an acoustic version of "The One That Got Away". Perry recorded three new songs for the re-issue, including "Dressin' Up", which lyrically documents dressing up for one's lover, and features a request by Perry for a "dirty doggie" to "pet her kitty". Her fourth studio album, Prism, was released in October 2013. It was noted for having a noticeably darker and moodier tone than her previous releases. "Dark Horse" is a trap and hip hop song about witchcraft and black magic. The song "Birthday" was Perry's attempt at writing a song which Mariah Carey would have included in her eponymous debut album. Aside from her regular collaborators, Perry co-wrote the track "Double Rainbow" with Sia and Greg Kurstin, while Emeli Sandé contributed lyrics to "It Takes Two". Her fifth album, Witness, was released in June 2017. Its tracks include "Bigger than Me", "Bon Appétit", "Chained to the Rhythm", and "Swish Swish".

In August 2020, Perry released her sixth studio album Smile with earlier released songs "Never Really Over" and "Harleys in Hawaii". It spawned the singles "Daisies" and "Smile" and a promotional single titled "What Makes a Woman".

Songs

Note: "Use Your Love" is largely a cover of "Your Love" by The Outfield and written by John Spinks.

References

 
Perry, Katy